Mortimer Nova was an experimental indie / anti-folk / indietronic group fronted by drummer/guitarist/vocalist Michael Vilches based out of the Tampa Bay area in Florida. Early Mortimer Nova began as a solo indie-folk project. Over the years, the band has acquired more musicians that have come and gone but Vilches has always remained in the band. Mortimer Nova uses an effected acoustic guitar, multi-vocal harmony, synthesized/sampled noise and a drum kit. Mortimer Nova was ranked No. 14 on Non-Hollywood's "25 Indie Music Artists Worth Paying For" poll in 2014. Michael has since donned the moniker of the band, and become a Twitch streamer. He is known well for his speedrun records, and his avid love for Scrooge McGoose.

Biography

Formation and debut
The band formed in Tampa, Florida in 2002. Vilches had already been playing solo shows for some time and decided to bring on 2 more members full-time to add a full band sound including Andrew Verastegui on lead guitar and Diego Verastegui on drums. Prior to that he had taken on guitarist Steve Martinez, formerly the drummer of Irrate. Mortimer Nova reformed in 2009 as lead guitarist A Verastegui left the band in May 2008. During August 2009, the band reformed with old drummer D Verastegui and Eric Hanson, formerly of Irrate and Faded Nimbus. Mortimer Nova stopped performing live in 2010 with the last lineup consisting of Vilches and D Verastegui. In November 2013, Mortimer Nova became active again on the website SoundCloud and ReverbNation by announcing upcoming shows. In 2014, they started performing live again with new drummer Robert Barrie and bassist Alan Thomas.

Terminal
In late 2006, Mortimer Nova recorded its first album. This was the first album recorded as a full band and included Vilches and A Verastegui on guitar and vocals and D Verastegui on drums and percussion. The band had moved in together in a townhouse in Tampa, Florida while recording the album. The album was mastered by A Verastegui and Anthony Becker. It was well received and multiple tracks from it continue to stay in circulation on satellite, internet and terrestrial radio nationally.

Terrible The Fish Has Drowned
The band reformed briefly in 2009 to record a 2nd studio album. Eric Hanson joined D Verastegui and Vilches to record a 10-song full-length album titled Terrible The Fish Has Drowned. The album features strong psychedelic overtones and uses a lot of soundscapes. The band broke up during the final mix of the tracks but Vilches still released the album the same year.

Mouth Full Of Bees
2011 saw the release of the album Mouth Full Of Bees, an experimental album made up of live performances and all acoustic renditions of previously unreleased solo material that had been recorded between 2006 and 2010. The songs included on the album were recorded originally for a 2-disc live/solo acoustic album containing a decade's worth of live material but the live tracks from 2000 to 2005 had gone missing. In 2011, the decision was made to release just the 2006–2010 recordings. There is an intro and ending track on the disc and there are no breaks in-between songs but rather filler noise, music and songs.

Flotsam
Vilches' first solo album Flotsam was released in 2012. The album combines dark electronic tracks, heavily distorted guitar tracks and ends with acoustic ballads. Even with such diversity from one track to another, the album as a whole was well received. This was also the first album recorded and mastered entirely by Vilches.

The Diary Of Valerie Hutchinson
In 2013, The Diary Of Valerie Hutchinson was released. It was scheduled to release in 2011 as the first disc on what was to be a 2-disc album called Mouth Full Of Bees but the tracks from 2000 to 2005 had gone missing. Once they were discovered, The Diary Of Valerie Hutchinson was released on its own. Just like Mouth Full Of Bees, it is made up of live recordings, demos and previously unreleased acoustic material.

Reformation
In November 2013 show dates were announced on multiple websites for Mortimer Nova after 3 years of the band not performing. On January 21, 2014, Mortimer Nova announced the recording of a new album via social media and continued regularly updating their official website. The band's line up was updated in February 2014 to include new members Robert Barrie on drums and Alan Thomas on Bass. Live performances immediately followed as the band prepared for the next album release.

You Are Now Manually Breathing
On May 12, 2014, the album You Are Now Manually Breathing was quietly released, only being announced on Facebook and via iTunes accompanied by a message stating "no party, no show; just a cd release". The album was an all electronic album with Vilches' vocals over a variety of different electronic and synth-based styles of music. The album did not feature any of the new band members but was still released under the Mortimer Nova moniker.

A Silver Tongue for a Steel Heart
On January 1, 2015 A Silver Tongue for a Steel Heart was intended to be released as the last solo album of Mortimer Nova. Vilches had picked up local singer-songwriter Bonnie Gosack and they began working on new material immediately after this album was released. During the recording of the follow-up album, Medium, she unexpectedly died at the age of 34 and the band was put on a permanent hiatus. On September 23, 2016, after over a year of silence Vilches, a post was put up on the band's ReverbNation page saying "goodbye." with a link to a previously unreleased and unfinished version of a song. The band's Facebook page has also been shut down. Since then, Medium has also appeared on the band's Bandcamp site though it was never promoted anywhere.

Medium
December 6, 2016 a 4 track EP titled Medium was posted on the BandCamp website. This album had been stopped during production and most of the recordings were scrapped as unfinished due to the untimely passing of their new lead singer. The album was self published and made available for free. BandCamp is the only place it has been made available to listen or download.

Hardware
As of July 2015, Michael Vilches uses an Epiphone Ultra-339, Yamaha APX500II, Roland XP-10, Alesis SR-15, Digitech RP-355, Behringer Eurorack UB1622FX-Pro.

Listener reviews
CD Universe :
"Recommended album if you like any of the following bands: The Lumineers, Radiohead, Grizzly Bear (band), Ugly Casanova, Pinback, Elliott Smith, The Flaming Lips, Wolf Parade, Ruby Suns, Of Montreal, Fleet Foxes, The Dodos, Blonde Redhead, Sunny Day Real Estate, The Black Heart Procession, Apples in Stereo, Modest Mouse, Pedro the Lion, The Appleseed Cast."

References

External links
Bandcamp
Facebook
YouTube
Spotify
Grooveshark
MySpace Page
SoundCloud
iHeartRadio

Indie rock musical groups from Florida
Musical groups established in 2002
Musical groups from Tampa, Florida